Shimpoli Road is a locality in north Mumbai, located in the western suburb of Borivali. It is a 15-minute walk from Borivali railway station.

Shimpoli road has a MTNL telephone exchange which mostly controls telecom in Borivali (West). The "Shyamaprasad Mookherjee Flyover" is situated very near to Shimpoli road thus Borivali (East) is at a walkable distance. The Shimpoli road stretches from the S.V. Road to the Chickoowadi, which is a highly affluent residential locality. A number of restaurants and fast food corners have come up in Shimpoli road as well.

Shimpoli started out as a small village community which has now receded to a corner of the locality to accommodate the highrise apartment blocks.

References

Neighbourhoods in Mumbai
Borivali